Performance Food Group Company (PFG) is an American company that was founded in 1885 in Richmond, Virginia, by food peddler James Capers. Headquartered in Goochland County, Virginia (just outside Richmond), the company distributes a range of food products, and has more than 22,000 employees. It has three divisions, each catering to specific market segments: Performance Foodservice, Vistar, and PFG Customized.

History 
James Capers' original business which was founded on 1885, grew into Pocahontas Foods. The company became Performance Food Group in 1987. In 2008, the company announced it was to be acquired by Wellspring Capital Management and Blackstone Group for $1.3 billion. Two other foodservice companies owned by the private equity firms, snack food distributor Vistar and Italian foodservice company Roma Foods, were then merged into PFG. PFG went public on October 2, 2015, at NYSE with issuing 14.5 million shares at $19 per share. The company is also a Fortune 500 company, which currently ranked at 114 as of 2021.

Acquisition History
 Core-Mark (2021)
 Eby-Brown (2019)
 Reinhart Foodservice (from Reyes Holdings) (2019)
 Springfield Foodservice Corp. (2001)

References

External links
 PFGC official website

Companies based in Richmond, Virginia
Catering and food service companies of the United States
Companies listed on the New York Stock Exchange
Food and drink companies established in 1885
2015 initial public offerings
1885 establishments in Virginia